Kearney is the county seat of Buffalo County, Nebraska, United States. The population was 33,790 in the 2020 census. It is home to the University of Nebraska at Kearney. The westward push of the railroad as the Civil War ended gave new birth to the community.

Geography
Kearney is located at  (40.700731, -99.081150) on I-80 with access to the major markets of Omaha-Lincoln, Denver, Kansas City, Des Moines, Wichita and Cheyenne, Kearney is at the center of a seven-state region and 20 million people.

Climate

Demographics

Kearney is the principal city of the Kearney, Nebraska Micropolitan Statistical Area, which consists of Buffalo and Kearney counties.

2010 census
As of the census of 2010, there were 30,787 people, 12,201 households, and 7,015 families residing in the city. The racial makeup of the city was 92.3% White, 1.0% African American, 0.3% Native American, 1.8% Asian, 3.1% from other races, and 1.4% from two or more races. Hispanic or Latino of any race were 7.3% of the population.

There were 12,201 households, of which 29.4% had children under the age of 18 living with them, 43.7% were married couples living together, 9.9% had a female householder with no husband present, 4.0% had a male householder with no wife present, and 42.5% were non-families. 30.4% of all households were made up of individuals, and 9% had someone living alone who was 65 years of age or older. The average household size was 2.36 and the average family size was 2.96 .

The median age in the city was 29 years. 22.2% of residents were under age 18; 20.5% were between ages 18 and 24; 25.6% were aged 25 to 44; 20.6% were aged 45 to 64; and 11.1% were aged 65 years or older. The gender makeup of the city was 48.9% male and 51.1% female.

2000 census
As of the census of 2000, there were 29,952 people, 10,549 households, and 6,160 families residing in the city. The population density was 2,498.5 people per square mile (964.6/km2). There were 11,099 housing units at an average density of 1,010.9 per square mile (390.3/km2). The racial makeup of the city was 95.18% White, 0.63% African American, 0.38% Native American, 0.92% Asian, 0.04% Pacific Islander, 1.68% from other races, and 1.17% from two or more races. Hispanic or Latino of any race were 4.08% of the population.

There were 10,549 households, out of which 30.3% had children under the age of 18 living with them, 45.7% were married couples living together, 9.7% had a female householder with no husband present, and 41.6% were non-families. 28.7% of all households were made up of individuals, and 9.5% had someone living alone who was 65 years of age or older. The average household size was 2.37 and the average family size was 2.96 .

In the city, the population was spread out, with 22.2% under age 18, 23.9% from 18 to 24, 26.2% from 25 to 44, 17.1% from 45 to 64, and 10.6% who were 65 years of age or older. The median age was 27 years. For every 100 females, there were 92.6 males. For every 100 females aged 18 and over, there were 89.7 males.

The median income for a household in the city was $34,829, and the median income for a family was $46,650. Males had a median income of $30,150 versus $22,366 for females. The per capita income for the city was $17,713. About 7.4% of families and 13.4% of the population were below the poverty line, including 11.8% of those under age 18 and 8.9% of those age 65 or over.

History

In the late 1840s, American settlers traveling westward arrived in significant numbers along the Mormon Trail and Overland Trails. This marked the beginning of Kearney's role as a crossroads on major east-west transportation arteries. In 1848, to safeguard westward migrants traveling through the region, the US Army established a military fort several miles southeast of the present city. Named after famed frontier military officer Stephen W. Kearny, Fort Kearny would become the namesake of the present city and serve as a  comfort station for gold prospectors, Pony Express riders, and Union Pacific Railroad workers until 1871.

The "e" in Kearney was added by mistake sometime afterwards by postmen who consistently misspelled the town name; eventually the spelling became nomenclature. 

The region expanded in 1866 with the arrival of the Union Pacific Railroad. The fixing of a junction point with the Burlington & Missouri River Railroad in 1871 anticipated the establishment of a townsite in the summer of that year. The city of Kearney was incorporated on December 3, 1873, the townsite being fixed a mille north of the Platte River. In 1874, Kearney was chosen to be the seat of Buffalo County, experiencing great population, economic, and infrastructural expansion in subsequent years that transformed the nascent city into the local business, education, and transportation center it remains to this day. This boom would be sustained through the next twenty-years, fueled by a post-Civil War period of frenzied economic expansion and wealth generation (Gilded Age) that was transforming the whole nation. Enterprising investors poured into the burgeoning community from the East and elsewhere, hoping to enrich themselves through ambitious speculative development schemes that, more often than not, turned out to be ill-conceived and economically unsustainable. An irrigation canal, electric street railway, and a five-story opera house were some of the projects to ultimately make it off the drawing board. These flush times would grind to a sudden halt as a result of the agricultural depression and economic crisis of the early 1890s.

In 1912, a Catholic Diocese was centered here. This status was removed in 1917, with the creation of other dioceses. In 1997, the city began to be used as a titular see by the Catholic Church.

Government
The council-manager form is used in Kearney. The City Council makes legislative and policy-making decisions. There are five members elected citywide to serve four-year terms which are staggered. The council manager form of government was adopted in 1950. Michael W. Morgan currently serves as city manager.

The council appoints a city manager to implement policies, prepare a budget, appoints department heads, and recommends areas that the council needs to attend. There are five members elected citywide serving staggered four-year terms. One member of the City Council is chosen by the council to be Mayor. Stanley Clouse is the Mayor.

Education

Primary and secondary schools
 Kearney Public Schools operates 3 preschools, 10 elementary schools, 2 middle schools, and Kearney High School
 Zion Lutheran School
 Faith Christian School of Kearney
 Kearney West High School, at the Youth Rehabilitation and Treatment Center
 Kearney Catholic High School

Post-Secondary Schools
 Central Community College has a branch campus in Kearney.

 University of Nebraska at Kearney (UNK) is located in the city. The campus is a  residential campus with more than 37 buildings. It was founded in 1905 as Nebraska State Normal School at Kearney and became Nebraska State Teachers College in 1921. Between 1963 and 1991 the school was known as Kearney State College. The college's name was changed to University of Nebraska at Kearney in 1991, when it joined the University of Nebraska system.

Economy
Companies headquartered in Kearney include Citizens Telecommunications Company of Nebraska and The Buckle.

According to Buffalo County Economic Development, the top non-manufacturing employers in the city are:

{| class="wikitable"
|+ Top non-manufacturing employers 
|-
! #
! Employer
! Employees
|-
| 1
| Good Samaritan Hospital
|style="text-align:right;"| 1,000+
|-
| 2
| University of Nebraska at Kearney
|style="text-align:right;"| 1,000+
|-
| 3
| Kearney Public Schools
|style="text-align:right;"| 750-1,000
|-
| 4
| Buckle (clothing retailer)
|style="text-align:right;"| 750–1,000
|-
| 5
| Kearney Regional Medical Center
|style="text-align:right;"| 500–750
|-
| 6
| HyVee
|style="text-align:right;"| 500–750
|-
| 7
| Cash-Wa
|style="text-align:right;"| 500-750
|-
| 8
| Walmart
|style="text-align:right;"| 250–500
|-
| 9
| Cabelas
|style="text-align:right;"| 250–500
|}

The top manufacturing employers are:
{| class="wikitable"
|+ Top manufacturing employers 
|-
! #
! Employer
! Employees
|-
| 1
| Baldwin Filters
|style="text-align:right;"| 1,000+
|-
| 2
| Eaton
|style="text-align:right;| 500-700
|-
| 3
| West Pharmaceutical Services
|style="text-align:right;"| 250–500
|-
| 4
| Chief Industries
|style="text-align:right;"| 100–250
|-
| 5
| BluePrint Engines
|style="text-align:right;"| 100–250
|-
| 6
| Morris Printing Group
|style="text-align:right;"| 100–250
|}

Transportation
The city operates Kearney Regional Airport located east of the city. Commercial air service is available via United Express with twice-daily service to Denver International Airport, as well as a daily non-stop flight to O'Hare Airport in Chicago, IL. The Union Pacific Railroad east-west main line runs through Kearney. Greyhound Bus Lines stops to pick up or discharge passengers in Kearney at 112 W. Talmadge Rd.

Local attractions
Kearney is home to several museums, many of which reflect its location on the California, Mormon, Oregon, and Pony Express trails, and the Lincoln Highway.

 The Great Platte River Road Archway Monument spans Interstate 80 at mile marker 274 and contains exhibits that trace the history of the Great Platte River Road from the Oregon Trail days to the present. President Bill Clinton toured the Great Platte River Road Archway Monument on December 8, 2000, while on a visit to Kearney. Jack Nicholson was filmed in a scene at the Archway for the movie About Schmidt.
 The Museum of Nebraska Art, the state's official art collection, houses artworks spanning 175 years, from the 19th century to the present.
 The George W. Frank House is an 1890s historic mansion located at the University of Nebraska at Kearney. The Robert M. Merryman Performing Arts Center, located in the city's Central Elementary School, is a 750 seat theater completed in 2006.
 The Trails & Rails Museum is home to many of the county's historic structures from the late 1800s-through the mid-1900s.
 The 5,500 seat Viaero Event Center hosts concerts, events, and performances, and is home to the Tri-City Storm, a United States Hockey League team.
In 2013, the Shrine Bowl State High School All-Star Football Game was moved from Lincoln to Kearney.
Two microbreweries, Thunderhead Brewing and the Platte Valley Brewery, are located in downtown Kearney.
 The Classic Car Collection is an automotive museum containing over 210 automobiles.

Local media

Newspaper
 Kearney Hub
Radio
KGFW AM 1340
KXPN (AM) 1460
KKPR-FM 98.9
KRNY FM 102.3
KQKY FM 105.9
Television
 KHGI-TV

Notable people
 Drew Anderson, MLB player
 Jon Bokenkamp, writer and producer
 Solomon Butcher, photographer of the Homestead era in Nebraska, lived in Kearney for about a decade, beginning in 1902
 Alexander H. Conner, politician
 Leslie Easterbrook, actress
 Tom Kropp, professional basketball player
 James A. Lake, evolutionary biologist
 Kyle Larson, NFL player
 Lorraine Langford, Nebraska politician
 Stephen R. Lawhead, author
 Brett Maher, NFL player
 David Martin, congressman
 Andy Pessoa, actor
 Peter George Peterson, U.S. Secretary of Commerce 1972–73, co-founder of the Blackstone Group
 Ryan Quincy, Emmy-winning animator, producer, and voice actor
 Tim Schlattmann, screenwriter
 Dan Schlissel, record producer and label founder (Stand Up! Records, -ismist Recordings)
 Kathy Lou Schultz, poet and scholar
 Charlie Tuna, radio personality
 Elizabeth T. Uldall, linguist
 Chuck Welch, artist
 Don Welch, American poet and academic, professor at the University of Nebraska at Kearney
 Dale E. Wolf, businessman and politician

Sports
 Kearney Yankees, 1956–1959, minor league baseball team affiliated with the New York Yankees
 Tri-City Storm, Tier I junior ice hockey team in the West Division of the United States Hockey League (USHL)

In popular culture
Dexter (season 6), episode 7 ("Nebraska", airdate November 13, 2011) was set in Kearney, Nebraska, in large part because the show's co-executive producer, Tim Schlattmann, is a 1981 Kearney High School graduate. In "Nebraska," whose departure in multiple ways from previous Dexter episodes was (for the most part) favorably received, witness protection has relocated the Trinity Killer's surviving family to Kearney, where a copycat killer appears to have murdered Trinity's widow and daughter, so Dexter travels to Kearney to avenge the killings. Numerous elements in the episode underscore Kearney's rural setting and culture, some sinister, and farm-specific settings and implements add variety to Dexter's methods of killing and corpse disposal.

References

External links

 
 
 
 

 
Cities in Buffalo County, Nebraska
Cities in Nebraska
Kearney Micropolitan Statistical Area
County seats in Nebraska
Catholic titular sees in North America